Émile Lejeune (born 17 February 1938) is a Belgian footballer. He played in ten matches for the Belgium national football team from 1960 to 1962.

References

External links
 

1938 births
Living people
Belgian footballers
Belgium international footballers
Place of birth missing (living people)
Association footballers not categorized by position